"Damage" is a song by American singer H.E.R., released on October 21, 2020, through RCA Records as the second single from her debut studio album Back of My Mind (2021). It was written by H.E.R., Ant Clemons, Carl McCormick, Tiara Thomas, Jimmy Jam and Terry Lewis, and produced by Cardiak and Jeff "Gitty" Gitelman. It samples Herb Alpert's 1987 song "Making Love in the Rain".

Music video
The music video was released on October 21, 2020. It was filmed at the Roxie Theatre in Los Angeles, H.E.R. performed at this with her band.

Live performance
On October 24, 2020, H.E.R. debuted "Damage" as guest on the Adele-hosted episode of Saturday Night Live.

Accolades

Commercial performance
On May 13, 2021, "Damage" was certified platinum by the RIAA with more than 1 million equivalent units sold.  On June 17, 2021, it was announced that it reached number one on R&B radio.

Charts

Weekly charts

Year-end charts

Certifications

References

2020 singles
2020 songs
H.E.R. songs
RCA Records singles
Songs written by Cardiak
Songs written by H.E.R.
Songs written by Ant Clemons
Songs written by Tiara Thomas
Songs written by Jeff Gitelman